Massimo Boscatto (born 21 June 1971) is a former professional tennis player from Italy.

Biography
Naples born Boscatto was primarily a doubles player. As a junior he represented Italy in the Sunshine Cup and his biggest individual success was reaching the final of the boys' doubles event at the 1988 US Open. He and partner Stefano Pescosolido lost the final to the home pairing of Jonathan Stark and John Yancey.

At the 1991 Mediterranean Games in Athens, Boscatto again partnered with Pescosolido and together they won a gold medal in the men's doubles, secured with a win over Spaniards Alberto Berasategui and Àlex Corretja.

On tour his biggest success was in reaching the final of an ATP Tour tournament in Genoa in 1991, with Massimo Ardinghi. He also won all of his three ATP Challenger doubles titles that year.

His only Grand Slam appearance was at the 1991 Wimbledon Championships. He competed in the men's doubles with Pescosolido. They were beaten in the first round by Jeff Brown and Bret Garnett.

ATP Tour career finals

Doubles: 1 (0–1)

Challenger titles

Doubles: (3)

References

External links
 
 

1971 births
Living people
Italian male tennis players
Tennis players from Naples
Mediterranean Games gold medalists for Italy
Mediterranean Games medalists in tennis
Competitors at the 1991 Mediterranean Games
20th-century Italian people